The Brereton Baronetcy, of Hanford in the County of Chester, was a title in the Baronetage of England. It was created on 10 March 1627 for William Brereton, Member of Parliament for Cheshire. The title became extinct on the death of the second Baronet in 1674.

Brereton baronets, of Hanford (1627)
Sir William Brereton, 1st Baronet (1604–1661)
Sir Thomas Brereton, 2nd Baronet (1632–1674)

References

Extinct baronetcies in the Baronetage of England